Middle Mesa is a census-designated place (CDP) in San Juan County, New Mexico, United States. It was first listed as a CDP following the 2010 census, replacing the Young Place CDP. At the 2010 census, Young Place had a population of 187.

The CDP is in the extreme northeast corner of the county, bordered to the north by La Plata and Archuleta counties in Colorado. It is to the west of Navajo Reservoir on the San Juan River.

Demographics

References 

Census-designated places in San Juan County, New Mexico
Census-designated places in New Mexico